Le Rhin (lit. The Rhine) is an 1842 travel guide written by Victor Hugo. Similar to Mark Twain's writings about the Mississippi, it includes many stories about the Rhine river. It ends with a political manifesto.

External links 
 Le Rhin at Wikisource 
 The Rhine: a tour from Paris to Mayence by the way of Aix-la-Chapelle, with an account of its legends, antiquities, and important historical events English translation on the Internet Archive

1842 non-fiction books
Travel guide books
Works by Victor Hugo
Rhine
French travel books